Premiere is a 1976 Romanian comedy film directed by Mihai Constantinescu and starring Carmen Stănescu, Radu Beligan, Toma Caragiu, Dem Rădulescu and Vasilica Tastaman.

Cast
 Carmen Stănescu as Alexandra Dan, wife of Mihai
 Radu Beligan  as Mihai Dan 
 Toma Caragiu as Titi Precup, actor 
 Dem Rădulescu as Fanache Verzea 
 Vasilica Tastaman as Veronica 
 Aurel Giurumia as Boiangiu 
 Carmen Galin  as Manuela Gherdan
 Virgil Ogășanu as Dumitrașcu 
 Emil Botta as Vasilică Savu
 Mircea Șeptilici as Bibi Vasiliu 
 Tamara Buciuceanu  as wife of Boiangiu 
 Andrei Ralea   
 Cristina Bugeanu   
 Elena Caragiu  as  Gina Ene  
 Constantin Fugașin  as  Nichi, son of Mihai and Alexandra Dan 
 Rodica Popescu Bitănescu  
 Florina Cercel  
 Constantin Bărbulescu   
 Chiril Economu
 Grigore Nagacevski  
 Alexandra Polizu
 Gheorghe Novac
 Nicolae Relea 
 Iuliana Delea
 Elefterie Voiculescu
 Astra Dan
 Alexandru Drăgan
 Gheorghe Cristescu
 Traian Zecheru
 Alexandru Vasiliu
 Vasile Dumitru
 Ana Vlădescu-Aron
 Gheorghe Dinică as Gheorghe Mihoc

References

1976 films
Romanian comedy films
1970s Romanian-language films
Films directed by Mihai Constantinescu
1976 comedy films